Hannahstown is a small village in County Antrim, Northern Ireland, on the outskirts of Belfast. It gives its name to a townland, parish and a suburb of Belfast. According to the 2011 United Kingdom census it had a population of 6,498.

History 
The area now known as Hannahstown was once known by the name of Ballincollig. A group of people whose family name was Hanna moved to the area in the 18th century. They moved in sufficient numbers for the village to be later be known by the name of 'Hannah's Town' in the early 19th century.

Buildings 
Notable buildings and institutions in Hannahstown include the Lámh Dhearg GAC a GAA club, St Joseph's Catholic Church and Divis transmitting station.

References 

http://www.logainm.ie/Viewer.aspx?text=hannahstown&streets=yes
http://www.ninis2.nisra.gov.uk/public/AreaProfileReportViewer.aspx?FromAPAddressMulipleRecords=Glencolin@PostCode@BT170LT@4?#353
http://hannastown.rushlightmagazine.com/
http://www.lamhdheargclg.com/
http://www.hannahstownparish.com/

Villages in Northern Ireland